Livonia Public Schools (LPS) is a public school district in southeastern Michigan Metro Detroit area, serving most of the city of Livonia and the northernmost portions of Westland. The district was formed in 1944 with other areas consolidated into it later.

Schools

Lower Elementary Schools (grades K-4)
Buchanan Elementary School (Livonia)
Cleveland Elementary School (Livonia)
Coolidge Elementary School (Livonia)
Grant Elementary School (Livonia)
Hayes Elementary School (Westland)
Hoover Elementary School (Livonia)
Kennedy Elementary School (Livonia)
Randolph Elementary School (Livonia)
Roosevelt Elementary School (Livonia)
Rosedale Elementary School (Livonia)

Upper Elementary Schools (grades 5-6)
Cooper Upper Elementary School (Westland)
Johnson Upper Elementary School (Westland)
Riley Upper Elementary School (Livonia)

K-6 Schools 
Webster Elementary School (Livonia)

Magnet schools:
 Niji-Iro Japanese Immersion Elementary School (Livonia)
 Niji-Iro Japanese Immersion Elementary School (the name means "rainbow colors", also stated in Japanese as にじいろ小学校, and 日本語マグネットスクール) is a public two-way Japanese-English immersion elementary school that opened on August 11, 2014.
 Niji Iro School began after a series of events related to Hinoki International School, which opened in 2010 as a charter school authorized by LPS. The school leased from LPS, occupying formerly-operating campuses, including McKinley Elementary School, and Taylor Elementary School. In March 2014, founder Ted Delphia stated that he had no further desire to manage Hinoki. Randy Liepa, the superintendent of Livonia schools, asked the board of the Hinoki school to merge with the Livonia School District. In May 2014, the Hinoki board voted to follow the recommendations of Hinoki parents and the PTO, and remain a charter school while entering into talks with LPS about possibly becoming part of that district in 2015-16. Liepa declined to renew the lease of the Livonia school facility. On July 28, Livonia Public Schools (LPS) revoked the Hinoki charter since the charter school had no building.
Using the former Taylor Elementary building (the same facility that housed Hinoki), LPS then opened a district-operated school-of-choice elementary school with a similar program, called the Niji-Iro Japanese Immersion Elementary School. For the 2014-15 school year, approximately 115 of the 185 students that were originally enrolled with Hinoki prior to its charter revocation enrolled in Niji-Iro, and the majority of teachers were hired to work there as well. As a district school Niji-Iro began operations on August 11, 2014. As of the 2014-2015 school year it had 130 students in grades Kindergarten through 4, with plans to add grades 5 and 6.
Anne Hooghart, the president of the school board, accused Delphia of conspiring with LPS to take control of the school without the board's consent, while Delphia denied this. Karen Smith of O & E Media wrote that "Hinoki stakeholders viewed the Livonia board's actions as a hostile takeover of their school, recruiting teachers and students without the Hinoki board's knowledge."
 Webster Elementary School Gifted Program (Livonia)

Middle Schools (grades 7-8)
Emerson Middle School  (Livonia, 1954) - This school was named after the American writer and philosopher, Ralph Waldo Emerson. This building is a North Central Association School. Mascot-Eagles
Frost Middle School (Livonia, 1963) - This school was named after Robert Lee Frost, the American poet. In addition to 7th and 8th graders, this building houses the MACAT (Middle Alternative Classrooms for the Academically Talented) program.  This building is also a North Central Association School. Mascot-Falcons.
Holmes Middle School (Livonia, 1967) - This school is named after Oliver Wendell Holmes, a famous physician, poet, and writer.  This is also a North Central Association school. Mascot-Hawks

High Schools (grades 9-12)

Benjamin Franklin High School (opened in 1962)
Adlai E. Stevenson High School (opened in 1966)
Winston Churchill High School (opened in 1969)

Other Schools 
Jackson Early Childhood Center (Livonia, 1956)
Livonia Career Technical Center (Livonia, 1969)
Perrinville Center (Livonia, 1936) Perrinville (at Adams Elementary), Closed 2016. Students and program distributed to other elementary schools in the district.
Western Wayne Skills Center (located now in the Garfield Elementary School building).

References

External links 

 [\http://www.livoniapublicschools.org Livonia Public Schools]

School districts in Michigan
Livonia, Michigan
Westland, Michigan
Education in Wayne County, Michigan
1944 establishments in Michigan
School districts established in 1944